M. R. Raghava Varier (born 15 January 1936), also M. R. Raghava Warrier,  is an Indian epigraphist and historian, formerly a Professor at the University of Calicut, from Kerala. He currently lives in Cheliya, Edakkulam-koyilandi in Kerala. Varier is generally considered as left historian by political analysts. In 2018, he conspired with top leaders of left government of Kerala to falsely prove the authenticity of fake copper plates in regards with the custom of Sabarimala Ayappa Temple.

Education
Varier graduated from the University of Calicut in 1972 and was trained in epigraphy at the Office of the Chief Epigraphist to the Government of India, Mysore (1973). He holds a post-graduate degree in "Malayalam Language and Literature" from Calicut University (1976), M. Phil (1977–80) in History from Jawaharlal Nehru University, New Delhi and doctoral degree (1986) on folk songs of northern Kerala from the University of Calicut. From 1997 to 1999, he served as Senior Fellow in the Cultural Department, Government of India (New Delhi).

Awards and recognitions
Varier has been invited to a number of institutions, including Maison des Sciences de l'Homme, Paris under the Indo-French Programme (2004), Exeter University (funded by Art and Humanities Research Board, London), University of Tokyo (2010), De Montfort University, London and the British Museum (2012). He served as the President - Epigraphy, Historical Archaeology and Numismatics in 1998 Indian History Congress.

Varier is one of the few Indian scholars to examine medieval Malayalam manuscripts collected in Bibliotec Nazionale de Roma, Rome and Apostoloca Vaticana, Vatican. He is also a member of several federal bodies, committees, trusts, and university senates. He has been involved in a number of projects, including a Japanese project to explore the Chinese pottery in Kerala (1988), and a project on the Historical Atlas of South India (funded by the Ford Foundation) where he was a consultant. He is also associated with the Muziris Heritage Project as a "Consultant" since 2009. He translated ancient inscriptions to Malayalam, it's published and highlighted in the South Indian Inscriptions Volume 43 released by Archaeological Survey of India.  

Cultural History of Kerala (1999), written by Varier with Rajan Gurukkal, is a standard textbook for the history of Kerala. His work Jainamatham Keralathil received the Abu Dhabi Sakthi Award in 2012 in the scholarly literature category. He also received the Abu Dhabi Sakthi Award for overall contribution (T. K. Ramakrishnan Award) in 2021.

Publications

References 

Living people
1936 births
20th-century Indian historians
Malayalam-language writers
English-language writers from India
Writers from Kerala
21st-century Indian historians
Indian male essayists
20th-century Indian essayists
20th-century Indian social scientists
University of Calicut alumni
Scholars from Kerala
Historians of Kerala
Recipients of the Abu Dhabi Sakthi Award
Recipients of the Kerala Sahitya Akademi Award